USS Protector may refer to the following ships:
 USS Protector  was a Continental Navy frigate captured by the British in May 1781.
  was a full-rigged ship.
 USS Protector was the planned name for the monitor ; name changed while the ship was still on the stocks
  was commissioned 28 December 1943; performed salvage and diving operations during much of her career; decommissioned on 15 May 1946
  was laid down as the Liberty ship SS Warren P. Marks; commissioned as the Protector 20 February 1957; operated off the United States Eastern Seaboard until her decommissioning 28 July 1965

Citations

United States Navy ship names